Al-Qadsia Sporting Club is primarily a professional football club. Based in Kuwait City, Al Qadsia was founded in 1953 and first called Al-Jazira, before being renamed to Al Qadsia SC on 20 October 1960. Qadsia currently plays in the Kuwait Premier League and has won the league recordable 17 times, as the top winning club.

Qadsia plays in the Mohammed Al-Hamad Stadium, which is in Hawalli, and is the third largest stadium in Kuwait.

History

Al Qadsia was one of the first Kuwaiti teams to be established, alongside Al-Arabi and Kuwait SC. They started playing in 1961–62 and finished second for three years in a row, behind Al-Arabi, which started the Kuwaiti El Clásico between them. Their first league title came in 1968–69.

Since 2002, Al-Arabi couldn't win the league which made Qadisa dominant by winning the league three times, then losing it three times to Kuwait SC, 
and winning it again four times in a row.

1960s
The 1961/62 season was the first official for Kuwaiti football. Qadsia was second in the league and Prince Cup, under the leadership of coach Mohammed Al-Hamad. The team won Kuwaiti league title in 1963/1964. The team lost in the Prince Cup 1963/1964 final against Al-Arabi Club 2–0. In 1964/1965 Egyptian coach Omar Khairy was appointed, and the team won second place. On 8 January 1965, Qadsia won in the 1964/65 Prince Cup final. In the season 1965/1966 coach Aladdin Niazi and won second place in the league for fifth consecutive time, this time behind the Al-Arabi SC, and team went out against Salmiya in the quarterfinals of Prince Cup. In the season of 1966/1967, under the leadership of coach Jean Cristo, the club won Prince Cup 1966/67 for the second time, after beating Al-Arabi SC 4–2. In 1967, the team won fourth place in the Kuwaiti league, and on 12 January 1968 Al-Qadisiya defeated Al-Arabi SC 2–1 in the Prince Cup final. In 1968/1969 Qadsia won the Kuwait league title for the first time in its history. In the 1969/1970 season club won third league place and emerged from the quarter-finals of Prince Cup by Yarmouk, which won the title later.

1970s

In the 1970/71 season under the leadership of coach Ron Lewin, Al Qadsia won league title 1970/1971 for the second time. The team went out of the cup quarter-final against Al-Arabi in the penalty shootout. In 1971/72 season, team emerged from the semi-finals of the 1971-1972 league playoffs. However, Qadsia won the Prince's Cup for the first time in their history. In the 1972/1973 season, the team finished fourth in Group A with 6 points and emerged from the league competition. In 1972–1973, the team emerged from the cup quarter-finals after losing to Al Arabi. The team won third place in the Kuwaiti league 1973/1974. In Prince Cup, Qadsia defeated Kuwait SC. In the 1974/75 season, the tournament was not organized, but Federation Cup was established and Qadsia came in third place. The team won Kuwaiti league 1974/1975 for the fifth time in its history, and in the Prince Cup, Qadsia defeated Kuwait Club two 2–0, scored by Faisal Al-Dakhil.
Qadsia won the next league title in 1975/76 without losing any match, and in the Prince Cup they lost to Kuwait SC. the 1976/77 league championship returned again and the team won second place behind Kuwait SC, after losing 5–3 in the final. 
As coach Ron Lewin returned and the team won the third place in the league, and in the Prince Cup 1978/79, the club managed to win the title after defeating Kazma SC.

1980s
In the 1980/81 season, under the leadership of coach Poniero, they finished third in the league, and in the Prince Cup they lost the quarter-finals to Kuwait Club. In 1982/1983, Al Qadsia was in sixth league place and third place in the Prince Cup. In the 1983/84 season, coach Milan Milanić was appointed. In the first season the team settled in fifth league place, and in Prince Cup reached quarter-finals. In the 1984/85 season, Muayad Al-Haddad moved to Qadsia from Kheitan Club. The team was in fifth place, and in the Prince's Cup was fourth place. 
In 1985/86 season, coach Bob Campbell was appointed. The team finished second in league behind Kazma, and in Prince Cup they finished third. In 1986/87 season, Kuwaiti coach Saleh Zakaria was appointed, the team finished fourth in the league and in Prince Cup the team emerged from the quarter-finals after losing to Al-Nasr Club on penalties. In 1987, Luiz Felipe Scolari was coach of the team, and the team settled in seventh place in the Kuwaiti league, which is the worst ever position of the club. In the Prince Cup the team went out in the preliminary round after losing against Al-Jahra SC in a penalty shootout. In 1988/1989 season, the team finished fourth in the Kuwaiti league. In the Prince Cup, they won title for the first time since 1978/1979. Qadsia won the final against Al-Arabi Club 2–0. In the Prince Cup 1989/1990, the team got third place. They also participated in the Silver Jubilee Championship, together with Al Arabi Club, Al Salmiya Club, Al Muharraq Club, Al Zawraa Club, and Zamalek SC. Qadsia and Zamalek qualified for the final, Qadsia won 1-0 after goal by Mohammed Ebrahim.

1990s
In the 1990s, period that followed Iraqi invasion of Kuwait, team appointed the Brazilian coach Fola in the 1991/1992 season. Al Qadsia won first place in the league, for the seventh time. In the 1992/1993 season, after Brazilian coach Scolari returned, they came second in the Kuwaiti Confederation Cup, losing in the final against Kuwait Club, and won second place in the Kuwaiti league behind Al Arabi Club. In 1993 club won new championship, the Crown Prince Cup, and got second place in the league behind Kazma SC. In the Prince Cup 1993/1994 Qadsia won the championship title after beating Al-Tadamon Club 2–1. The club did not compete in the Crown. In the 1995/96 season, coach Idanaldo Patricio took charge of the club. Qadsia won third league place. In the Prince Cup 1996/1997 Qadsia won second place, after losing to Kazma 2–0. In the 1997/1998 season Jorvan Vieira was appointed as coach. Qadsia came out in the quarter-final against Kazma, who won the title later. In the season of 1998/1999, Qadsia won league title for eighth time in its history, after winning the final game against Al-Tadamon Club. In Prince's Cup Qadsia went out of the quarter-finals against Al-Sahel. In 1999/2000 season Mohamed Ibrahim took over the club, and the team won second league place. In the Prince Cup, Qadsia was fourth. In Gulf Clubs Cup, Qadsia won the championship for the first time in the club's history.

2010s 
Al Qadsia has been to the final of the AFC Cup twice (2010 and 2013), but lost both, first to Al-Ittihad Aleppo and second to Kuwait SC. Al Qadsia won the 2014 AFC Cup for the first time, in their third final appearance. Qadsia is first club in Kuwait to win four trophies in a year, in the 2013–14 season (Kuwait Super Cup, Kuwait Crown Prince Cup, Kuwait Premier League, and AFC Cup).

Honours

 
  shared record

Defunct tournaments 
 Al-Khurafi Cup: 2
 2002–03, 2005–06

Futsal

Kuwaiti Futsal League: 2
2012–13, 2013–14

Kuwait Futsal Federation Cup: 5
2010–11, 2011–12, 2013–14, 2014–15, 2015–16

Kuwait Futsal Super Cup: 3
2013, 2014, 2016

Current squad

 (captain)

Performance in AFC competitions
 AFC Champions League: 4 appearances
2006: Semi-Finals
2008: Quarter-Finals
2014: 3rd Round Qualifying
2015: 3rd Round Qualifying

AFC Cup: 8 appearances

2010: Final
2011: Round of 16
2012: Round of 16
2013: Final
2014: Winner
2015: Semifinal
2019: Group stage 
2020: Cancelled

 Asian Club Championship: 1 appearance
2000: First round (withdrew)

 Asian Cup Winners Cup: 1 appearances
1994–95: Second round

Presidents and managers

Presidential history

Qadsia has had numerous presidents over the course of their history.

Managerial history
Below is a list of Qadsia coaches from 1960 until the present day.

Asian clubs ranking

References

External links

 
Association football clubs established in 1960
Football clubs in Kuwait
Football clubs in Kuwait City
1960 establishments in Kuwait
Unrelegated association football clubs
Sports teams in Kuwait
AFC Cup winning clubs